A  (in New Zealand Māori, Cook Islands Māori, Tahitian),  (in Tongan),  (in Marquesan) or  (in Samoan) is a communal or sacred place that serves religious and social purposes in Polynesian societies. In the Rapa Nui culture of Easter Island, the term  has become a synonym for the whole marae complex.

In some modern Polynesian societies, notably that of the Māori of New Zealand, the marae is still a vital part of everyday life. In tropical Polynesia, most marae were destroyed or abandoned with the arrival of Christianity in the 19th century, and some have become an attraction for tourists or archaeologists. Nevertheless, the place where these marae were built are still considered  (sacred) in most of these cultures.

Etymology
The word has been reconstructed by linguists to Eastern Oceanic *malaqe with the meaning "open, cleared space used as meeting-place or ceremonial place".

New Zealand 

Like the related institutions of old Polynesia, the marae is a wāhi tapu, a 'sacred place' which carries great cultural meaning.

This area is used for pōwhiri (welcome ceremonies) featuring oratory. The wharenui is the locale for important meetings, sleepovers, and craft and other cultural activities.

The wharekai (dining hall) is used primarily for communal meals, but other activities may be carried out there.

For example, the word  refers to the bench where the speakers sit; this means it retains its sacred and ceremonial associations.  vary in size, with some  being a bit bigger than a double garage, and some being larger than a typical town hall.

Legal status
A  is a meeting place registered as a reserve under the Te Ture Whenua Māori Act 1993 (The Māori Land Act). The charter details matters such as:

the methods used to select trustees;
the ways in which the trustees may be held accountable by the beneficiaries, and methods for conflict resolution;
procedures for amending the charter, and for ensuring adherence to its principles.

The Institute is responsible for the building and restoration of over 40  around the country.

Traditional, church, and educational uses
Most iwi, hapū, and even many small settlements have their own marae. An example of such a small settlement with its own marae is at Hongoeka Bay, Plimmerton, the home of the renowned writer Patricia Grace. Since the second half of the 20th century, Māori in urban areas have been establishing intertribal marae such as Maraeroa in eastern Porirua. For many Māori, the marae is just as important to them as their own homes.

Some New Zealand churches also operate marae of their own, in which all of the functions of a traditional marae are carried out. Churches operating marae include the Anglican, Presbyterian, and Catholic churches. In recent years, it has become common for educational institutions, including primary and secondary schools, technical colleges, and universities, to build marae for the use of the students and for the teaching of Māori culture. These marae may also serve as a venue for the performance of official ceremonies relating to the school.

The  of the University of Auckland, for instance, is used for graduation ceremonies of the Māori Department, as well as welcoming ceremonies for new staff of the university as a whole. Two detailed secondary-school marae are located in the Waikato at Te Awamutu College and Fairfield College. The latter was designed by a Māori architect with a detailed knowledge of carving and weaving; its  features an intricately carved revolving  as well as many other striking features. In addition to school activities, it is used for weddings.

Tangihanga (funeral rites) 
As in pre-European times,  continue to be the location of many ceremonial events, including birthdays, weddings, and anniversaries. As indicated by Ka'ai and Higgins, "the importance of the tangihanga and its central place in marae custom is reflected in the fact that it takes precedence over any other gathering on the marae".

Cook Islands

In the Cook Islands, there are many historic marae (tapu or sacred places) that were used for religious ceremonies on the islands. Rarotonga and Aitutaki have some particularly impressive marae. Although many of the carved figures on the marae were either destroyed or confiscated by Christian missionaries, the stones of many of the ancient marae still remain to this day. Some marae are in better shape than others, as vegetation grows fast on the islands. In Rarotonga, a few of the marae (Arai-te-Tonga, Vaerota, Taputapuātea) are still maintained, and are quickly tidied up before the investiture of a new ariki.

Rarotongan tradition holds that Taputapuātea marae at Rarotonga, which archaeologists have dated to the 13th century, was built by Tangi'ia who brought the central stone with him from the ancient marae of the same name at Ra'iātea. Indeed, it seems that it was quite usual in ancient times to take a stone from this marae. The son of Tetupaia and Teu had not only the right to a seat in the great Marae of Taputapuatea in Raiatea, but he could take his stone from Taputapuatea and set it up in his own district of Pare Arue (Tahiti), so founding a Marae Taputapuatea of his own to wear the Maro-'ura (red waist girdle of the ariki) in.

Mangaia had a marae named Taputapuatea and an ariori house.

Rapa Nui/Easter Island

In the remote southeastern corner of the Polynesian Triangle elements of the traditional Polynesian marae evolved into the Rapa Nui/Easter Island Ahu and their iconic Moai (statues).

Tahiti

According to Salmond, marae are "portals between Po, the world of the gods and darkness, and the Ao, the everyday world of people and light, so that people could communicate with their ancestors."  Notable marae include Vai'otaha marae on Borabora, Mata'ire'a marae on Huahine, and Taputapuatea marae on Ra'iātea.  'Oro marae on Tahiti included Vai'otaha marae at Tautira, the first, followed by Utu-'ai-mahurau at Paea, Mahaiatea marae at Papara, Taraho'i marae at Pare-'Arue, and Hitia'a marae on Hitiaa O Te Ra.  

In Tahiti, marae were dedicated to specific deities, and also connected with specific lineages said to have built them. During the 1994 restoration of Taputapuātea marae at Ra'iātea island by archaeologists from the Tahiti Museum, human bones were discovered under some of the structures. It is possible they were the remains of sacrifices to the Polynesian god Oro, revered in Tahiti.

See also
Lists of marae in New Zealand
Heiau
Dap-ay

Notes

References
Hirini Moko Mead, 2003. Tikanga Māori: Living by Māori Values. Huia Publishers: Wellington.

External links

Māori Maps, a guide to New Zealand marae
The marae – meeting place, New Zealand in History
Gérard, Bertrand, Le marae: description morphologique in Cahiers des Sciences Humaines, 1978, Vol. 15, No 4, pp. 407–448. Architecture and morphology of Society Islands Marae
John Joseph Knight Hutchin, E Tuatua no te apai atinga ki mua i te marae, i te tuatau etene anga ("Tale of the offerings at the marae in heathen time") in "Collected songs and legends from the southern Cook Islands (c. 1883-–1912)", notebook 2
Marae Protocols

Māori culture
Māori words and phrases
 Marae
Māori society
Tahitian culture
Polynesian culture
Indigenous architecture
Religious buildings and structures in Oceania
Austronesian spirituality